Michael Wright may refer to:

Sportspeople
Michael Wright (Australian footballer) (born 1959), former VFL footballer for South Melbourne
Michael Wright (basketball) (1980–2015), murdered American–Turkish basketball player
Michael Wright (cyclist) (born 1941), English former professional road bicycle racer from 1962 to 1976
Michael Wright (field hockey) (1922–2001), Singaporean Olympic hockey player
Michael Wright (swimmer) (born 1966), Hong Kong swimmer
Mick Wright (footballer, born 1946), English football right back with Aston Villa
Mick Wright (footballer, born 1950), English football defender with Darlington
Mickey Wright (1935–2020), American golfer
Mike Wright (American football) (born 1982), American football player
Mike Wright (baseball) (born 1990), American baseball player
Mike Wright (cricketer) (born 1950), New Zealand cricketer

Other
Michael Wright (actor) (born 1956), American film and television actor
Michael Wright (architect) (1912–2018), Hong Kong architect
Michael Wright (Australian politician) (born 1956), Australian Labor Party member of the South Australian House of Assembly
Michael T. Wright (born 1948), former curator of mechanical engineering
Michael T. Wright (engineer) (1947–2015), British engineer
Michael Wright (academic) (1952–2019), professor of entrepreneurship
Wonder Mike (born 1957), American rapper, born Michael Wright
Michael Ragsdale Wright, American artist
Michael W. Wright (1938–2020), Minneapolis business executive
Michael Wright (Australian businessman) (1937–2012), Australian heir and businessman
Michael Wright (diplomat) (1901–1976), British diplomat

See also
John Michael Wright (1617–1694), British portrait painter